Mohd Zawawi bin Ahmad Mughni (born 20 September 1970) is a Malaysian politician and currently serves as Member of Selangor State Legislative Assembly for Sungai Kandis since 8 August 2018 and Selangor State Executive Councillor since 17 September 2020.

Election results

Selangor State Legislative Assembly

References

1970 births
Living people
People's Justice Party (Malaysia) politicians
Members of the Selangor State Legislative Assembly
Selangor state executive councillors